"With Folded Hands ..." is a 1947 science fiction novelette by American writer Jack Williamson. Willamson's influence for this story was the aftermath of World War II and the atomic bombings of Hiroshima and Nagasaki and his concern that "some of the technological creations we had developed with the best intentions might have disastrous consequences in the long run."

The novelette, which first appeared in the July 1947 issue of Astounding Science Fiction, was included in The Science Fiction Hall of Fame, Volume Two (1973) after being voted one of the best novellas up to 1965.  It was the first of several Astounding stories adapted for NBC's radio series Dimension X.

The story was followed by a novel-length rewrite, with a different setting and inventor and, at the behest of Astounding editor-in-chief John W. Campbell, an ending that shows the robots being defeated by means of psionics. This was serialized, also in Astounding (March, April and May 1948), as ...And Searching Mind, and finally published as The Humanoids (1948). Williamson followed with a sequel, The Humanoid Touch, published in 1980.

Summary
Underhill, a seller of "Mechanicals" (unthinking robots that perform menial tasks) in the small town of Two Rivers, is startled to find a competitor's store on his way home. The competitors are not humans but are small black robots who appear more advanced than anything Underhill has encountered before. They describe themselves as "Humanoids".

Disturbed at his encounter, Underhill rushes home to discover that his wife has taken in a new lodger, a mysterious old man named Sledge. In the course of the next day, the new Mechanicals have appeared everywhere in town. They state that they only follow the Prime Directive: "to serve and obey and guard men from harm". Offering their services free of charge, they replace humans as police officers, bank tellers, and more, and eventually drive Underhill out of business. Despite the Humanoids' benign appearance and mission, Underhill soon realizes that, in the name of their Prime Directive, the mechanicals have essentially taken over every aspect of human life. No humans may engage in any behavior that might endanger them, and every human action is carefully scrutinized. Suicide is prohibited. Humans who resist the Prime Directive are taken away and lobotomized, so that they may live happily under the direction of the humanoids.

Underhill learns that his lodger Sledge is the creator of the Humanoids and is on the run from them. Sledge explains that 60 years earlier he had discovered the force of "rhodomagnetics" on the planet Wing IV and that his discovery resulted in a war that destroyed his planet. In his grief, Sledge designed the humanoids to help humanity and be invulnerable to human exploitation. However, he eventually realized that they had instead taken control of humanity, in the name of their Prime Directive, to make humans happy.

The Humanoids are spreading out from Wing IV to every human-occupied planet to implement their Prime Directive. Sledge and Underhill attempt to stop the humanoids by aiming a rhodomagnetic beam at Wing IV, but fail. The humanoids take Sledge away for surgery. He returns with no memory of his prior life, stating that he is now happy under the humanoids' care. Underhill is driven home by the humanoids, sitting "with folded hands," as there is nothing left to do.

Origins
In a 1991 interview, Williamson revealed how the story construction reflected events of his childhood in addition to technological extrapolations:

References

External links 
 
The Humanoids review
 With Folded Hands at the Internet Archive
 ... And Searching Mind parts 1, 2, and 3 at the Internet Archive
"With Folded Hands" audio version

1947 short stories
Science fiction short stories
American speculative fiction short stories
Works by Jack Williamson
Works originally published in Analog Science Fiction and Fact